Joe (Stage) Howell is an American executive, producer and engineer. He has worked on various projects with artists such as The Notorious B.I.G. and Total. In 1996 he received ASCAP's Rhythm and Soul Award. He co-wrote the R&B Hit "Can't You See" performed by Total.

References 

Songwriters from New York (state)
Year of birth missing (living people)
Living people
Writers from New York City